Whitewood can be:

Plants
The wood of spruce trees.
Bucida buceras, a Caribbean tree
Coccoloba krugii, a species of seagrape
Petrobium, an endemic tree from the island of St Helena
Elaeocarpus kirtonii, an Australian rainforest tree
Elaeocarpus obovatus, an Australian rainforest tree
Liriodendron tulipifera, a large North American flowering tree
Tabebuia heterophylla, a tree of Caribbean islands

Places
Whitewood, Saskatchewan, Canada
Whitewood, South Dakota, United States
Whitewood, Virginia, United States
Whitewood Creek, a stream in South Dakota

Ships
Ships in the United States Navy:
USS Whitewood (AG-129)
USS Whitewood (AN-63)

Other uses
 When a pinball machine is in the development phase the prototype playfield is called a "whitewood".
 Whitewoods, an American chillwave/vaporwave music duo